Yei Agricultural and Mechanical University (YA&MU) is a university in South Sudan.

Location
The university is located in the city of Yei, in Yei River County, Central Equatoria, South Sudan. The city of Yei is the capital of Yei River County and is the second-largest city in the Greater Equatoria Region of South Sudan, after Juba, the national capital.

Overview
The university was established in Yei, prior to the independence of South Sudan in July 2011.

See also
 Juba
 Western Equatoria
 Equatoria
 Education in South Sudan
 List of universities in South Sudan

References

Universities in South Sudan
Western Equatoria
Equatoria